Celtic started season 2006–07 looking to retain the Scottish Premier League trophy and the Scottish League Cup. They also competed in the Scottish Cup, and entered the Champions League at the group stage. 
Such was the good form of Celtic and the lack of a clear rival in the early stages of the 2006–07 season, that bookmakers Paddy Power paid out on Celtic as the winners of the SPL on 6 November 2006, only 13 games into the season. By mid-November Celtic were 11 points clear of their nearest challengers.

Having qualified automatically for the group stage of the Champions League, Celtic were drawn with Benfica, Copenhagen, and Manchester United. Although Celtic lost their 3 away games, a 100% record at home earned them qualification to the knockout stage for the first time since the group format was introduced in 1992–93. Their opponents in the last 16 were Milan. After both legs of the tie ended 0–0, Celtic's Champions League run was ended by a solitary Milan goal in extra-time by Kaká.

During the January 2007 transfer window Celtic signed Scotland internationals and former Hearts players Steven Pressley and Paul Hartley, full-back Jean-Joël Perrier-Doumbé from Rennes on loan and goalkeeper Mark Brown from Inverness Caledonian Thistle.

On 22 April 2007 Celtic won their second consecutive league championship, and 40th overall. The title was secured by an injury-time free-kick from Shunsuke Nakamura in a 2–1 victory against Kilmarnock. The result left Celtic 13 points clear of Rangers with four matches remaining. They finished the season 12 points above Rangers.

On 26 May 2007 Celtic won the Scottish Cup for a record 34th time after beating Dunfermline 1–0. The winner was scored by Jean-Joël Perrier-Doumbé in the 84th minute.

Results

Scottish Premier League

UEFA Champions League

Scottish League Cup

Scottish Cup

Player statistics

Appearances and goals

List of squad players, including number of appearances by competition

|}
NB: Players with a zero in every column only appeared as unused substitutes

Goal scorers

Team statistics

League table

Technical staff

Transfers

Out: 2006–07 Season

Total income:  £7,830,000
Total spending:  £9,650,000

Loans
Loaned out:

See also
 List of Celtic F.C. seasons

References

Celtic F.C. seasons
Celtic
Scottish football championship-winning seasons